Fivay was a settlement in Florida, near present-day Hudson.

See also
 List of former municipalities in Florida
 List of ghost towns in Florida
 List of places in Florida: F

References

External links
Fivay, Florida (Ghost Towns.com)

Former populated places in Pasco County, Florida
Former populated places in Florida